Metachanda heterobela is a moth species in the oecophorine tribe Metachandini. It was described by Anthonie Johannes Theodorus Janse in 1954.

References

Oecophorinae
Moths described in 1954